This is a bibliography of works by Donald Barthelme.

Books

Novels

Collections

Children's Books

Short Works
Includes short stories, satires, parodies, fables, and illustrated stories, arranged by first date of publication.

1959-1969

1970-1974

1975-1979

1980-1989

Posthumously published stories

Plays

References

Bibliographies by writer
Bibliographies of American writers
Postmodern literature bibliographies